Maappillai is a 1952 Indian Tamil-language drama film directed by T. R. Raghunath and written by V. N. Sambandam. The film stars T. R. Ramachandran, P. K. Saraswathi and T. K. Ramachandran. It revolves around an office boy who becomes wealthy in a rags to riches manner, and the attempts made by his boss's son to destroy him and usurp his wealth. The film was released on 7 November 1952 and became a success.

Plot

Cast 
 T. R. Ramachandran as the office boy
 P. K. Saraswathi as Nalini
 T. K. Ramachandran as the printing-press head's son
 P. V. Narasimha Bharathi as Kumar
 Kaka Radhakrishnan as the doctor
 M. N. Rajam as the nurse
 R. Balasubramaniam as the printing-press head

Production 
Maappillai was directed by T. R. Raghunath, written by V. N. Sambandam and produced by National Productions. Cinematography was handled by P. S. Selvaraj, and editing by S. A. Murugesan. The film was shot and processed at Newton Studios.

Soundtrack 
The soundtrack was composed by T. R. Pappa and N. S. Balakrishnan, while the lyrics were written by Thanjai N. Ramaiah Dass. The song "Dosu Kodukka Venum", picturised on Radhakrishnan and Rajam, satirises "men, mores and morals", and attained popularity.

Release and reception 
Maappillai was released on 7 November 1952, and became a commercial success.

References

External links 
 

1950s Tamil-language films
1952 drama films
1952 films
Films directed by T. R. Raghunath
Films scored by T. R. Pappa
Indian drama films